Jesse Samuel Burbage (February 22, 1894 – December 5, 1957) was an American basketball player and coach. He was a four-year starter at the guard position for the Auburn Tigers from 1914 to 1918. Burbage served as the head coach of the Trinity Blue and White (now the Duke Blue Devils) from 1922 to 1924.

Burbage later served as an Army colonel. Circa 1951, he became administrator of the City-County Hospital in Tuskegee, Alabama, where he would serve for six years until his death. He died on December 5, 1957 at Huntsville Hospital.

Head coaching record

References

External links
 J.S. Burbage at Sports-Reference.com

1894 births
1957 deaths
American hospital administrators
American men's basketball players
Guards (basketball)
Auburn Tigers men's basketball players
Duke Blue Devils men's basketball coaches
Florida Southern Moccasins men's basketball coaches
Florida Southern Moccasins football coaches
United States Army colonels
People from Shelbyville, Kentucky